In mathematics, plurisubharmonic functions  (sometimes abbreviated as psh, plsh, or plush functions) form an important class of functions used in complex analysis. On a Kähler manifold, plurisubharmonic functions form a subset of the subharmonic functions. However, unlike subharmonic functions (which are defined on a Riemannian manifold) plurisubharmonic functions can be defined in full generality on complex analytic spaces.

Formal definition

A function

with domain 
is called plurisubharmonic if it is upper semi-continuous, and for every complex line

 with  

the function  is a subharmonic function on the set

In full generality, the notion can be defined on an arbitrary complex manifold or even a complex analytic space  as follows.  An upper semi-continuous function

is said to be plurisubharmonic if and only if for any holomorphic map
 the  function

is subharmonic, where  denotes the unit disk.

Differentiable plurisubharmonic functions 
If  is of (differentiability) class , then  is plurisubharmonic if and only if the hermitian matrix , called Levi matrix, with
entries

 

is positive semidefinite.

Equivalently, a -function f is plurisubharmonic if and only if  is a positive (1,1)-form.

Examples

Relation to Kähler manifold: On n-dimensional complex Euclidean space  ,   is plurisubharmonic. In fact,   is equal to the standard Kähler form on  up to constant multiples. More generally, if  satisfies

for some Kähler form , then  is plurisubharmonic, which is called Kähler potential. These can be readily generated by applying the ddbar lemma to Kähler forms on a Kähler manifold.

Relation to Dirac Delta: On 1-dimensional complex Euclidean space  ,  is plurisubharmonic. If  is a C∞-class function with compact support, then Cauchy integral formula says

which can be modified to
.
It is nothing but Dirac measure at the origin 0 .

More Examples 
 If  is an analytic function on an open set, then  is plurisubharmonic on that open set.
 Convex functions are plurisubharmonic
 If  is a Domain of Holomorphy then  is plurisubharmonic
 Harmonic functions are not necessarily plurisubharmonic

History

Plurisubharmonic functions were defined in 1942 by
Kiyoshi Oka and Pierre Lelong.

Properties
The set of plurisubharmonic functions has the following properties like a convex cone:
 if  is a plurisubharmonic function and  a positive real number, then the function  is plurisubharmonic,
Plurisubharmonicity is a local property, i.e. a function is plurisubharmonic if and only if it is plurisubharmonic in a neighborhood of each point.
If  is plurisubharmonic and  a monotonically increasing, convex function then  is plurisubharmonic.
If  is a monotonically decreasing sequence of plurisubharmonic functions
then  is plurisubharmonic.
Every continuous plurisubharmonic function can be obtained as the limit of a monotonically decreasing sequence of smooth plurisubharmonic functions. Moreover, this sequence can be chosen uniformly convergent.
The inequality in the usual semi-continuity condition holds as equality, i.e. if  is plurisubharmonic then

 

(see limit superior and limit inferior for the definition of lim sup).

 Plurisubharmonic functions are subharmonic, for any Kähler metric.
Therefore, plurisubharmonic functions satisfy the maximum principle, i.e. if  is plurisubharmonic on the connected open domain  and

 

for some point  then  is constant.

Applications

In complex analysis, plurisubharmonic functions are used to describe pseudoconvex domains, domains of holomorphy and Stein manifolds.

Oka theorem

The main geometric  application of the theory of plurisubharmonic functions is the famous theorem proven by Kiyoshi Oka in 1942.

A continuous function 
is called exhaustive if the preimage 
is compact for all . A plurisubharmonic
function f is called strongly plurisubharmonic
if the form 
is positive, for some Kähler form
 on M.

Theorem of Oka: Let M be a complex manifold,
admitting a smooth, exhaustive, strongly plurisubharmonic function.
Then M is Stein. Conversely, any
Stein manifold admits such a function.

References
 
 Steven G. Krantz. Function Theory of Several Complex Variables, AMS Chelsea Publishing, Providence, Rhode Island, 1992.
 Robert C. Gunning. Introduction to Holomorphic Functions in Several Variables, Wadsworth & Brooks/Cole.
 Klimek, Pluripotential Theory, Clarendon Press 1992.

External links

Notes

Subharmonic functions
Several complex variables